The M17 (also known as the T2 grenade
) is a rifle grenade that was used by the United States during World War II.

Description

Firing
Once the warhead is screwed in, the M17 is fitted onto a grenade launcher adapter, such as the M7 grenade launcher. A special blank .30-06 cartridge is inserted into the rifle, then fired. The M17 will not explode if it lands on sand, water or mud; only solid ground will cause it to detonate.

History

Adoption

The M17 was adopted in 1943. It was the United States' primary anti-personnel rifle grenade during the middle part of World War II.

Obsolescence
By the middle of 1944, the M17 had essentially been supplanted by the M1 Grenade Projection Adapter, which allowed a standard grenade to be converted into a rifle grenade.

References

External links
Pictures of the M17

Grenades of the United States
World War II infantry weapons of the United States
Rifle grenades